The following is a list of national roads in South Sudan. The list is not exhaustive.

National roads

See also
Transport in South Sudan

References

External links

 
South Sudan